This is a list of notable alumni, faculty, and benefactors of the University of Maryland, College Park.

Academia

Gar Alperovitz (b. 1936), Ph.D. Lionel R. Bauman professor of political economy 
Alida Anderson, Ph.D. 2006, author and professor at American University.
David A. Bader (b. 1969), Ph.D. 1996, professor of computing at Georgia Tech 
Charles L. Bennett (b. 1956), B.S. 1978, astrophysicist at Johns Hopkins University
Alok Bhargava (b. 1954), Ph.D. professor, University of Maryland School of Public Policy 
Mark A. Boyer (b. 1961), Ph.D. 1988, Board of Trustees Distinguished Professor of Political Science, University of Connecticut
Harry Clifton "Curley" Byrd (1889–1970), B.S. 1908, president of the University of Maryland, 1935–1954 
William J. Byron (b. 1927), Ph.D. 1969, president of The Catholic University of America 
Joan Callahan (1946–2019), Ph.D. 1982, professor emerita of philosophy at the University of Kentucky
Kenneth C. Catania (b. 1965), B.S. 1989, neurobiologist at Vanderbilt University, MacArthur Fellowship awarded in 2006 
John Dryzek (b. 1953), Ph.D. 1980, professor of political theory and social theory at Australian National University
Donald West Harward, Ph.D., president of Bates College
 Dagmar R. Henney (b. 1931), 1931, one of the first female mathematicians known for her work as a professor of calculus, finite mathematics, and measure and integration
Richard Herman, Ph.D. 1967, chancellor of the University of Illinois at Urbana–Champaign 
Charlene Drew Jarvis (b. 1941), Ph.D. 1971, president of Southeastern University (Washington, D.C.) 
Andrew Kliman (b. 1955), B.A. 1978, professor of economics at Pace University 
J.D. Kleinke (b. 1962), B.Sc. 1989, writer and entrepreneur in the field of health care
Albin Owings Kuhn (1916–2010), B.S. 1938, M.S. 1939, Ph.D. 1948, executive vice president of the University of Maryland System (1979–1982), vice president of the University of Maryland, Baltimore (1965–1979) and the University of Maryland, Baltimore County (1965–1971)
Simon Asher Levin (b. 1941), Ph.D. 1964, professor of ecology at Princeton University and winner of Kyoto Prize in Basic Sciences 
Jacqueline Liebergott, president of Emerson College 
Patrick Maggitti, first provost of Villanova University and former dean of the Villanova School of Business
Manning Marable (1950–2011), Ph.D. 1976, professor of public affairs, political science, and history at Columbia University
Tobin J. Marks (b. 1944), B.S. 1966, professor of material science and engineering at Northwestern University, awarded the 2002 American Institute of Chemists' gold medal
Marc Melitz (b. 1968), M.S.B.A. 1992, professor of economics at Harvard University
Arnold L. Rheingold (b. 1940), professor of chemistry at the University of California, San Diego 
Michael Rustad, M.A., professor of law at Suffolk University Law School
Shen Chun-shan (1932–2018), Ph.D. 1961, president of the Taiwanese National Tsing Hua University (1993–1997)
Adele H. Stamp (1893–1974), M.A. 1924, dean of women at the University of Maryland, namesake of the Adele H. Stamp Student Union
Thomas B. Symons (1880–1970), president of the University of Maryland (1954)
Lida Lee Tall (1873–1942), principal and president of State Teachers College at Towson (now Towson University) 
Barbara A. Williams, associate professor of astronomy at the University of Delaware (1986), first African American woman to earn a PhD in astronomy. 
Robin West (b. 1954), B.A., professor of law at Georgetown University Law Center
Qiang Yang (b. 1963), Ph.D. 1989, professor of Hong Kong University of Science and Technology

Nobel laureates
Raymond Davis, Jr. (1914–2006), B.S. 1937, M.S. 1940, physicist and recipient of the 2002 Nobel Prize in Physics; lead scientist behind the Homestake Experiment
Herbert Hauptman (1917–2011), Ph.D. 1955, mathematician and recipient of the 1985 Nobel Prize in Chemistry; only non-chemist to receive the award
Thomas Schelling (1921–2016), economist, professor of foreign policy, national security, nuclear strategy, and arms control, and recipient of the 2005 Nobel Prize in Economics

Arts and entertainment

Shabbir Ahluwalia (b. 1979), Indian television actor
Mitch Allan, B.A., singer, songwriter, producer
Karen Allen (b. 1951), actress in (Animal House, The Blues Brothers, Raiders of the Lost Ark) 
Mike Auldridge (1938–2012), 1967, Grammy Award-winning musician 
Robbie Basho (1940–1986), singer, songwriter 
Art Bell (1945–2018), broadcaster, author
Lewis Black (b. 1948), comedian (attended; transferred to UNC Chapel Hill)
Janet Blair, M.A., singer, songwriter, classical oboist
Frank Cho (b. 1971), drew comic strip for The Diamondback and creator of the comic strip and comic book Liberty Meadows
Mark Ciardi (b. 1961), film producer (Miracle, The Rookie)
Larry David (b. 1947), B.A. 1970, actor, writer and producer (Curb Your Enthusiasm, Seinfeld)
Cedric Dent, Ph.D. 1997, singer, composer, and arranger for influential a cappella group Take 6; Professor of Music at Middle Tennessee State University
Stefania Dovhan, soprano 
Doris Downes (b. 1961), artist 
Michael Ealy (b. 1973), B.A., actor (Barbershop series)
 Max and Spencer Ernst, musicians and founders of the band Shaed   
Sean Garrett, A.A., musician (attended the school's German program while father was on deployment in Germany)
Jim Henson (1936–1990), B.S. 1960, creator of the Muppets
Carlisle H. Humelsine (1915–1989), B.A. 1937, founder of Colonial Williamsburg
Jan Johns, voice actor (Mikey Mouse Funhouse)
Wayson R. Jones, artist
Jason Kravits (b. 1967), actor (The Practice) 
Jeff Krulik, film director (Heavy Metal Parking Lot)
Mark Lasoff, M.S. 1988, Academy Award winner for visual effects for Titanic
Brian MacDevitt, 5 time Tony Award winner for Best Lighting Design, Associate Professor of lighting design at the University of Maryland, College Park
Beth McCarthy-Miller (b. 1963), B.A., Saturday Night Live director, 1995–2006; 30 Rock director 
Aaron McGruder (b. 1974), creator of The Boondocks series 
Virginia Mecklenburg (b. 1948), Ph.D. 1983, curator at the Smithsonian American Art Museum
Peter Mehlman (b. 1956), 1977, writer and co-executive producer (Seinfeld)
David Mills (1961–2010), screenwriter, author, and journalist; writer for the Emmy-winning HBO miniseries The Corner and Treme 
Adam Neely (b. 1988), jazz musician, bassist, and YouTuber
Michael Olmert (b. 1940), B.A. 1962, Ph.D. 1980, writer and three-time Emmy Award winner for his work on the Discovery Channel, professor of English at the University of Maryland
Jeremy Penn (b. 1979), painter
Ryan Pickett, award-winning film director
Robin Quivers (b. 1952), radio personality and co-host of The Howard Stern Show 
Giuliana Rancic (b. 1974), television personality, anchor of E! News
Allyn Rose (b. 1988), Miss Sinergy 2010, Miss Maryland USA 2011 and Miss USA 2011 (Top 8)
Peter Rosenberg (b. 1979), DJ, radio personality and co-host of Hot 97's Ebro in the Morning 
Bitty Schram (b. 1968), actress (Monk) 
Mark Schwahn (b. 1966), creator of One Tree Hill
David Silverman (b. 1957), (attended, 1975–1977), animator, director, producer on The Simpsons, director of The Simpsons Movie, and co-director of Monsters, Inc.
David Simon (b. 1960), creator, producer, and co-writer of The Wire and creator of Homicide: Life on the Street 
Erin Smith (b. 1972), guitarist of Bratmobile; activist
Tiffany Taylor, Playboy Playmate (November 1998)
Ken Waissman, Tony Award-winning Broadway producer 
Douglass Wallop (1920–1985), playwright, Damn Yankees
Carol Stuart Watson (1931–1986), illustrator and publisher
Dianne Wiest (b. 1948), actress, two-time Academy Award winner 
Tracy Young, deejay and remixer

Business

William F. Andrews (c. 1933), former chairman of the Singer Corporation and the Corrections Corporation of America
Gail Berman (b. 1956), B.A. 1978, former president of Paramount Pictures
Tom Bernard, co-president of Sony Pictures Classics
Eric F. Billings (b. 1954), chairman and CEO of both Friedman Billings Ramsey and FBR Capital Markets Corporation
Keith Brendley (b. 1958), B.S., 1980, leading authority on active protection systems and president of Artis, a research and development company
Sergey Brin (b. 1973), B.S. 1993, co-founder of Google
Robert D. Briskman (b. 1932), co-founder of Sirius Satellite Radio
A. James Clark (1927–2015), B.S. 1950, president of Clark Construction, namesake of the A. James Clark School of Engineering
Michael D. Dingman (1931–2017), B.A. 1955, international investor
Raul Fernandez (c. 1966), chairman and CEO of Proxicom, co-owner of the NHL Washington Capitals, NBA Washington Wizards, director of Liz Claiborne
Carly Fiorina (b. 1954), M.B.A. 1980, former chair and CEO of Hewlett-Packard, 2010 Republican nominee for California United States Senate seat

Kathryn S. Fuller, chairman of the board Ford Foundation former president and CEO of non-governmental organization World Wildlife Fund
Hugh Newell Jacobsen (1929–2021), B.A. 1951, world-renowned architect and Fellow of the American Institute of Architects
Jeong H. Kim (b. 1960), Ph.D. 1991, president of Bell Labs
Kenny Kramm (1961–2016), founder and creator of FLAVORx
Chris Kubasik, former president and COO of Lockheed Martin
Samuel J. LeFrak (1918–2003), B.S. 1940, chaired the LeFrak Organization, one of the largest private building firms in the world
William E. Mayer, owner of the Hartford Colonials, former CEO of Credit Suisse
Creig Northrop, (B.A. 1989), real estate agent and broker, president and CEO of Northrop Realty
Lou Pai (b. 1947), former CEO of Enron Energy Services
Kevin Plank (b. 1972), B.A. 1996, founder of Under Armour athletic apparel company
J. Christopher Reyes (b. 1953), co-founder and chairman of Reyes Holdings
Robert H. Smith (1928–2009), B.S. 1950, real estate developer, namesake of the Robert H. Smith School of Business
Ed Snider (1933–2016), owner of the Philadelphia Flyers and the Philadelphia 76ers
Daniel Snyder (b. 1964) (attended), owner of the Washington Redskins, chairman of the board of Six Flags
Dennis R. Wraase, CEO of Pepco Holdings

Government and public policy

Presidents
Galo Plaza (1906–1987), B.S. 1926, President of Ecuador (1948–1952), Secretary General of the Organization of American States (1968–1975)
Ma Ying-jeou (b. 1950), President of the Republic of China (2008–2016)

Governors

Harry R. Hughes (1926–2019), B.S. 1949, Governor of Maryland (1979–1987)
Marvin Mandel (1920–2015), B.A. 1939, Governor of Maryland (1969–1979)
Mike Parson (b. 1955), Governor of Missouri (2018–present)

Senators
Gordon Humphrey (b. 1940), 1962, U.S. Senator from New Hampshire
Joseph Tydings (1928–2018), B.S. 1950, U.S. Senator from Maryland 
Millard Tydings (1890–1961), B.S. 1910, U.S. Senator from Maryland who introduced legislation in 1920 to create the University of Maryland

Congressmen
Harry Streett Baldwin (1894–1952), U.S. Congressman, 1943–47
Dennis Cardoza (b. 1959), U.S. Congressman from California 
William Lacy Clay, Jr. (b. 1956), B.A. 1974, U.S. Congressman from Missouri
William Purington Cole, Jr. (1889–1957), B.S. 1910, U.S. Congressman from Maryland, namesake of Cole Field House
Roy Dyson (b. 1948), Maryland State Senator, former U.S. Congressman
Stephen Warfield Gambrill (1873–1938), U.S. Congressman, 1924–38 
William F. Goodling (1927–2017), B.S. 1953, U.S. Congressman from Pennsylvania
Steny Hoyer (b. 1939), B.S. 1963, U.S. Congressman from Maryland and House Majority Leader of the 110th United States Congress, chief sponsor of the Americans with Disabilities Act
Thomas Francis Johnson (1909–1988), U.S. Congressman from Maryland's 1st district, 1959–63

Tom Kindness (1929–2004), B.A. 1951, U.S. Congressman from Ohio
Ernest Konnyu (b. 1937), (attended), U.S. Congressman from California
Tom McMillen (b. 1952), B.S. 1974, former U.S. Congressman from Maryland and Rhodes Scholar
Parren Mitchell (1922–2007), M.A. 1952, former U.S. Congressman from Maryland, Maryland's first black congressman
Dutch Ruppersberger (b. 1946), B.S. 1967, U.S. Congressman from Maryland
Eric Swalwell (b. 1980), B.A. 2003, U.S. Congressman from California
Esteban Torres (b. 1930), 1965, U.S. Congressman from California
Jennifer Wexton (b. 1968), U.S. Congresswoman from Virginia

State legislators
Saqib Ali (b. 1975), Maryland State Delegate 
David R. Brinkley (b. 1959), B.A. 1981, Maryland State Senator 
James Brochin (b. 1964), Maryland State Senator 
John W. Derr (b. 1941), Maryland State Senator
Andy Dinniman (b. 1944), M.A. 1969, Pennsylvania State Senator
Charles W. Famous (1875–1938), 1901, Maryland delegate
Patrick N. Hogan (b. 1979), 2002, Maryland State Delegate 
Thomas E. Hutchins, Maryland State Delegate and Maryland State Police superintendent 
Verna L. Jones (b. 1955), B.A. 1978, Maryland State Senator 
Delores G. Kelley (b. 1936) 
James M. Kelly (b. 1960), 1988, special assistant to President Bush, Maryland State Delegate 
Rona E. Kramer (b. 1954) 
Eric Luedtke (b. 1981), B.A. 2002, M.Ed. 2004, Maryland State Delegate and House of Delegates Majority Leader 
William Daniel Mayer (b. 1941), Maryland State Delegate 
Tony McConkey (b. 1963), Maryland State Delegate 
Thomas V. Miller, Jr. (1942–2021), B.S. 1964, president of the Maryland Senate
Paul V. Nolan (1923–2009), Tennessee General Assembly, 1969–1970
Douglas J.J. Peters (b. 1963) 
Eileen M. Rehrmann (b. 1944), B.S. 1997, Maryland State Delegate, Harford County Executive 
Justin Ross (b. 1976), Maryland State Delegate 
James E. Rzepkowski (b. 1971), 1993, Maryland State Delegate 
John F. Slade III (b. 1943), 1967, Maryland State Delegate 
Charles H. Smelser (1920–2009), 1942, Maryland State Senator 
Paul S. Stull (b. 1936), Maryland State Delegate
Ronald Young (b. 1940), Maryland State Senator

Military personnel

Reginald M. Cram (1914–2004), M.S., 1963, United States Air Force major general, adjutant general of the Vermont National Guard
Julius W. Becton, Jr. (b. 1926), former Federal Emergency Management Agency director, retired U.S. Army lieutenant general 
Joseph C. Burger (1902–1982), B.S. 1925, U.S. Marine Corps general 
Florent A. Groberg (b. 1983), B.S. 2006, retired U.S. Army captain and recipient of the Medal of Honor
John R. Lanigan (1902–1974), B.S. 1926, United States Marine Corps Brigadier general and recipient of the Navy Cross
Robert B. Luckey (1905–1974), B.S. 1927, U.S. Marine Corps general
Thomas R. Norris (b. 1944), B.S. 1967, retired U.S. Navy SEAL and recipient of the Medal of Honor
 Leonard T. Schroeder Jr. (1918–2009), retired U.S. Army colonel, first soldier ashore on D-Day in World War II 
Stephen G. Olmstead (b. 1929), B.S. 1961, U.S. Marine Corps general
George B. Simler (1921–1972), U.S. Air Force general 
Kevin R. Slates (b. 1959), retired United States Navy admiral
Robert Nicholas Young (1900–1964), B.S. 1922, United States Army general
Dominic Salvatore Gentile (1920–1951), 1951, U.S. Air Force major and legendary fighter pilot

International figures
Kwesi Ahwoi (b. 1946), Minister for Food and Agriculture of Ghana 
Yahya Al-Mutawakel (b. 1959), Yemeni Trade Minister
 Anies Baswedan (b. 1969), Governor of Jakarta
Nguyen Si Binh, chairman of the anti-communist People's Action Party of Vietnam 
Galo Plaza (1906–1987), President of Ecuador, Secretary General of the Organization of American States 
Shirley Thomson (1930–2010), Director of the Canada Council

Diplomats
Prudence Bushnell (b. 1946), U.S. diplomat and former U.S. Ambassador to Guatemala and Kenya
Joseph B. Gildenhorn (b. 1929), former U.S. Ambassador to Switzerland (1989-1993)
L. Craig Johnstone (b. 1942), former U.S. Ambassador to Algeria and current UN Deputy High Commissioner for Refugees 
Robert W. Jordan (b. 1945), U.S. Ambassador to Saudi Arabia 
Edward J. Perkins (1928–2020), former U.S. Ambassador to the United Nations, Liberia, and South Africa 
Robin Raphel (b. 1947), U.S. Ambassador to Tunisia 
David M. Satterfield (b. 1954), U.S. diplomat in the Middle East; senior advisor on Iraq for the secretary of state

Jurists
Mary Stallings Coleman (1914–2001), B.A. 1935, chief justice of the Supreme Court of Michigan, first female justice of the court
Joyce Hens Green (b. 1928), senior United States District Court judge for the District of Columbia 
W. Louis Hennessy (b. 1955), associate judge 4th District of Maryland, former member of Maryland House of Delegates
Sybil Moses (1939–2009), prosecutor of the "Dr. X" Mario Jascalevich murder case and New Jersey Superior Court judge
Eugene O'Dunne (1875–1959), pioneering anti-racist judge on the Supreme Bench of Baltimore

U.S. Government officials

Stephen T. Ayers (b. 1962), B.S., former Architect of the Capitol 
Richard A. Baker (b. 1940), Ph.D. 1982, first Historian of the United States Senate
John Berry (b. 1959), B.A. 1980, former U.S. Ambassador to Australia, former Director of the U.S. Office of Personnel Management, and former director of the National Zoo 
Robert C. Bonner (b. 1942), B.A. 1963, former Commissioner of the U.S. Customs Service and former Administrator of the Drug Enforcement Administration 
James Clapper (b. 1941), B.S. 1963, former Director of National Intelligence; lied to congress over the mass surveillance of the American people
Gordon R. England (b. 1937), B.S. 1961, United States Deputy Secretary of Defense, former Secretary of Navy and deputy secretary of the U.S. Department of Homeland Security
Vivek Kundra (b. 1974), B.S. 1998, first Chief Information Officer of the United States
Sean McCormack (b. 1964), M.A. 1990, former U.S. Assistant Secretary of State for Public Affairs
Donald A. Ritchie (b. 1945), M.A. 1969, Ph.D. 1975, current Historian Emeritus of the United States Senate
Mark Rosenker (1946–2020), B.A. 1969, former Chairman of the National Transportation Safety Board
Kori Schake (b. 1962), White House advisor, currently a fellow at the Hoover Institute
Charles L. Schultze (1924–2016), chairman, Council of Economic Advisers in the Carter administration
Faryar Shirzad (b. 1965), advisor to U.S. President George W. Bush
William W. Skinner (1874–1953), B.S. 1895, chemist, United States Department of Agriculture, one of the first to study the impact of chemical pollution on the Potomac River and Chesapeake Bay
Jeff Trandahl (b. 1964), executive director of the National Fish & Wildlife Foundation, former clerk of the U.S. House of Representatives
Reginald V. Truitt (1890–1991), B.S. 1914, M.S. 1921, zoologist, founded the Chesapeake Biological Laboratory at the University of Maryland Center for Environmental Science
John W. Vessey (1922–2016), chairman of the Joint Chiefs of Staff

Others
Lester R. Brown (b. 1934), M.S. 1959, founder and president of the Earth Policy Institute
Zainab Chaudry, civil rights and political activist
Josh Cohen (b. 1973), B.A. 1995, former Mayor of Annapolis, Maryland (2009–2013)
Karen Davis (b. 1944), Ph.D., founder and president of United Poultry Concerns
Karen L. Haas (b. 1962), 33rd Clerk of the United States House of Representatives 
Butch Kinerney (1990 news-editorial journalism), expert in risk and crisis communications
Elaine Marshall (b. 1945), North Carolina Secretary of State 
Mike Parson (b. 1955), Lieutenant Governor of Missouri
Bernice Sandler (1928–2019), Ed.D. 1969, women's rights activist whose work led to the enactment of Title IX
Carsten Sieling (b. 1959), German politician (German Federal Diet – Deutscher Bundestag)
Susan Turnbull (b. 1952), vice chair of Democratic National Committee, nominated to lead Maryland Democratic Party
Mark K. Updegrove (b. 1961), B.A. 1984, director of the LBJ Presidential Library

Journalism

Lee Abbamonte, travel blogger and the youngest American to visit all 193 United Nations member states
Joy Bauer (b. 1963), dietitian on the Today Show, columnist for Self 
Art Bell (1945–2018), founder and host of the radio program, Coast to Coast AM 
Bonnie Bernstein (b. 1970), network TV sports reporter
Carl Bernstein (b. 1944), Watergate journalist 
Jayson Blair (b. 1976), New York Times journalist 
Tim Brant (b. 1949), sportscaster for WJLA, Raycom Sports, ABC and CBS
Steve Byrnes (1959–2015), former NASCAR broadcaster and pit road reporter with NASCAR on FOX and TBS Superstation; sideline reporter for Raycom Sports, play-by-play announcer for NFL on FOX; producer 
Tina Cervasio (b. 1974), television sportscaster for WNYW and Big Ten Network
Norman Chad (b. 1958), sports writer, ESPN personality 
Kiran Chetry (b. 1974), former Fox News Channel personality and former CNN American Morning co-host
Connie Chung (b. 1946), B.S. 1969, news anchor with CBS, NBC, and CNN
Sarah Cohen, Pulitzer Prize winner, The Washington Post 
Heidi Collins (b. 1967), anchor for CNN 
Brian Crecente (b. 1970), videogame columnist for the Rocky Mountain News and editor of Gawker-owned videogame blog Kotaku
Jeanne Cummings, government team deputy editor at Bloomberg News in Washington, D.C., formerly at Politico, and The Wall Street Journal 
Mark Davis (b. 1957), talk radio host at KSKY and columnist with The Dallas Morning News
Giuliana DePandi (b. 1974), television host for E! News Live 
Ben Ephson (b. 1957), publisher and Managing Editor of the Daily Dispatch
Rebecca Gomez (b. 1967), correspondent for Fox Business
Jack Kelley, former reporter for USA Today 
Gayle King (b. 1954), editor-at-large for O: The Oprah Magazine, host for an XM Radio program 
Tim Kurkjian (b. 1956), analyst for ESPN 
Sharanjit Leyl (b. 1973), business anchor, BBC World News
Robin Lundberg (b. 1981), American sports broadcaster
Cassie Mackin (1939–1982), national news correspondent, television news anchor, and Emmy Award winner 
Mark McEwen (b. 1954), TV personality for CBS Morning News and The Early Show
Jamie McIntyre, former senior Pentagon correspondent for CNN
Soraya Sarhaddi Nelson, bureau chief for NPR bureau in Afghanistan 
Robert M. Parker, Jr. (b. 1947), B.A. 1970, wine critic
Marianela Pereyra, sportscaster, sideline reporter, television host, and health food expert
Jimmy Roberts (b. 1957), reporter for NBC 
Rowan Scarborough, writer and former The Washington Times columnist 
Patrick Stevens (b. 1968), former sportswriter for The Washington Times
Bert Sugar (1936–2012), boxing writer and historian 
Scott Van Pelt (b. 1966), anchor for SportsCenter on ESPN 
Jim Walton, president and CEO of CNN 
Pam Ward, anchor for ESPN and ESPN2
David Zurawik (b. 1949), Ph.D. 2000, TV and media critic for The Baltimore Sun; assistant professor at Goucher College

Pulitzer Prize

 Carl Bernstein (b. 1944), broke the Watergate scandal with Bob Woodward; their work helped earn The Washington Post a Pulitzer Prize for Public Service in 1973 
 David S. Broder (1929–2011), professor at the Philip Merrill College of Journalism and weekly columnist for The Washington Post; Pulitzer Prize for Distinguished Commentary 
 James MacGregor Burns (1918–2014), presidential biographer, scholar at the James MacGregor Burns Academy of Leadership at the University of Maryland; won Pulitzer Prize and National Book Award for 1971 biographer of President Franklin D. Roosevelt 
 Sarah Cohen, shared the Pulitzer Prize for Investigative Reporting in 2002; professor at Duke University 
 Mary Lou Forbes (1926–2009), (attended), Pulitzer Prize–winning journalist at the Washington Evening Star and The Washington Times 
 Jon D. Franklin (b. 1943), B.S. 1970, journalist for the Baltimore Evening Sun, 1979 Pulitzer Prize for Feature Writing, 1985 Pulitzer Prize for Exploratory Journalism
 Louis Harlan (1922–2010), professor emeritus of history at the University of Maryland, Pulitzer Prize in Biography 
 Jane Healy, editor of the Orlando Sentinel, chair of the board of visitors at the Philip Merrill College of Journalism
Haynes Johnson (1931–2013), awarded Pulitzer Prize in 1966 for distinguished national reporting on the civil rights crisis in Alabama; professor and knight chair at the Philip Merrill College of Journalism 
Sarah Kaufman (b. 1963), 2010 Pulitzer Prize for Criticism for The Washington Post
Manning Marable (1950–2011), 2012 Pulitzer Prize for History, Malcolm X: A Life of Reinvention 
 Deborah Nelson, won Pulitzer Prize for investigative reporting in 1997; director of Carnegie Seminar at the University of Maryland
 Eric Newhouse, M.A. 1970, 2000 winner of the Pulitzer Prize in Exploratory Journalism
Leonard Pitts (b. 1957), nationally syndicated columnist and winner of the 2004 Pulitzer Prize for Commentary; visiting professor at Maryland 
Gene Roberts (b. 1932), 2007 winner for History; former managing editor for The New York Times and current professor at the Philip Merrill College of Journalism

Literature

Kofi Aidoo, Ghanaian author
Rosario Ferré (1938–2016), poet 
John Glad (1941–2015), Russian literature expert and eugenicist 
Martha Grimes (b. 1931), author of detective fiction 
Joe Haldeman (b. 1943), science fiction writer, best known for The Forever War 
Karen Hesse (b. 1952), author of children's literature, MacArthur Fellow
N. K. Jemisin (b. 1972), award-winning science fiction writer
Bettina Judd, author and poet
Jeff Kinney (b. 1971), The New York Times bestselling author of the Diary of a Wimpy Kid series 
Jeffrey Kluger (b. 1954), writer, best known for co-writing Lost Moon: The Perilous Voyage of Apollo 13 with Jim Lovell, basis of the movie Apollo 13
Gina Kolata (b. 1948), award-winning author and science journalist for The New York Times 
Munro Leaf (1905–1976), B.A. 1927, author
George Pelecanos (b. 1957), mystery writer 
Matt Beynon Rees, award-winning crime novelist, former journalist for Time 
Michael J. Varhola (b. 1966), author of several history books and founder of Skirmisher Publishing

Science and technology

Richard R. Arnold (b. 1963), NASA astronaut, Space Shuttle Discovery 
Stephen T. Ayers (b. 1962), United States architect of the Capitol 
Frederick S. Billig (1933–2006), M.S. 1958, Ph.D. 1964, pioneer of the scramjet at the Johns Hopkins University Applied Physics Laboratory
Sergey Brin (b. 1973), co-founder and technology president of Google 
Robert D. Briskman (b. 1932), M.S.E.E., 1961, co-founder of Sirius Satellite Radio 
Jeffrey Bub (b. 1942), physicist, researcher on quantum foundations, and winner of the 1998 Lakatos Award
George Dantzig (1914–2005), B.A. 1936, mathematician
Raymond Davis Jr. (1914–2006), winner of the 2002 physics Nobel Prize 
Jeanette J. Epps (b. 1970), NASA astronaut, CIA intelligence officer 
Charles Fefferman (b. 1949), B.S. 1966, mathematician and child prodigy, winner of the Fields Medal, received his B.S. with honors at the age of 17
Robert Fischell (b. 1929), M.S. 1953, inventor and physicist, University of Maryland benefactor
Virgil D. Gligor (b. 1949), pioneer in computer security and applied cryptography
Kevin Greenaugh (b. 1956), first person of African American descent to earn a PhD in Nuclear Engineering from the University of Maryland; Assistant Deputy Administrator for Strategic Partnership Programs of the National Nuclear Security Administration
Michael Griffin (b. 1949), NASA administrator 
Victoria Hale, founder and CEO of Institute for OneWorld Health, MacArthur Fellow and adjunct associate professor of biopharmaceutical sciences at University of California, San Francisco, advisor to the World Health Organization 
Sara Hallager, B.S. in zoology, ornithologist and curator of birds at the Smithsonian's National Zoo
Elaine D. Harmon (1919–2015), B.S. 1940, microbiology; WASP aviator in WWII, inurned at Arlington
Herbert Hauptman (1917–2011), winner of the 1985 Nobel Prize in Chemistry 
Don Hopkins, free and open source software computer programmer, game designer, hacker, and artist
Kate Hutton, seismologist at Caltech
Kenny Kramm (1961–2016), founder of FLAVORx
Vivek Kundra (b. 1974), chief technology officer for Washington, D.C., advising President Barack Obama's transition committee on technology issues 
George J. Laurer (1925–2019), B.S. 1951, inventor of the universal product code (UPC)
Russell Marker (1902–1995), B.S. 1923, M.S. 1924, chemist, researcher of steroid chemistry, inventor of octane rating system
William McCool (1961–2003), NASA astronaut, killed on Columbia mission STS-107 
Beverly Mock, Ph.D. 1983, geneticist and deputy director of the National Cancer Institute's Center for Cancer Research. 
Sujal Patel, B.S. 1996, president and CEO of Isilon Systems
Judith Resnik (1949–1986), Ph.D. 1977, NASA astronaut, died aboard the Space Shuttle Challenger
Paul W. Richards (b. 1964), NASA astronaut who flew on Discovery mission STS-102 
Raymond St. Leger (b. 1957), mycologist, author, and professor 
Alex Severinsky, one of developers of the hybrid engine used in the Prius and in other hybrid vehicles 
Heather Stapleton, American environmental organic chemist and exposure scientist
Tim Sweeney (b. 1970), computer game programmer and founder of Epic Games
Grace Wahba (b. 1934), M.A. 1962, statistician, developed generalized cross-validation and formulated Wahba's problem
Joseph Weber (1919–2000), co-inventor of the maser and father of gravitational wave detection
Barbara A. Williams, Ph.D. 1981, astrophysicist, first African-American woman to earn a doctorate in astrophysics
Aracely Quispe Neira (b. 1982), M.S. geospatial Intelligence, NASA senior astronautical engineer, professor, researcher

Sports

Baseball
Brett Cecil (b. 1986), former Major League Baseball (MLB) pitcher 
Wayne Franklin (b. 1974), former MLB pitcher 
Kevin Hart (b. 1982), former Major League Baseball (MLB) pitcher
Charlie Keller (1916–1990), former MLB player, five-time All-Star selection
 Adam Kolarek (b. 1989), pitcher in the Los Angeles Dodgers organization
Brandon Lowe (b. 1994), MLB player, All-Star and 2020 American League Champion for the Tampa Bay Rays
Justin Maxwell (b. 1983), former MLB player  
Eric Milton (b. 1975), MLB player
LaMonte Wade Jr. (b. 1994) MLB player for the San Francisco Giants

Men's basketball
Players

Lonny Baxter (b. 1979), former NBA player 
Len Bias (1963–1986), basketball player, 1986 ACC Athlete of the Year 
Steve Blake (b. 1980), NBA player 
Keith Booth (b. 1974), former NBA player 
Adrian Branch (b. 1963), former NBA player 
Nik Caner-Medley (b. 1983), professional basketball player for Maccabi Tel Aviv 
Brad Davis (b. 1955), former NBA player 
Juan Dixon (b. 1978), former NBA player, 2002 NCAA Tournament MOP, ACC Athlete of the Year 
Len Elmore (b. 1952), former NBA player, television sports commentator for ESPN 
Steve Francis (b. 1977), NBA player, 2000 NBA Co-Rookie of the Year 
Jerry Greenspan (1941–2019), former NBA player 
Kevin Huerter (b. 1998), 19th pick of 2018 NBA draft Atlanta Hawks 
Šarūnas Jasikevičius (b. 1976), professional basketball player for Panathinaikos, former NBA player 
Billy Jones, former head coach for the University of Maryland, Baltimore County 
Albert King (b. 1959), former NBA player, 1980 ACC Player of the Year 
Jake Layman (b. 1994), professional basketball player for the Minnesota Timberwolves
Alex Len (b. 1993), Ukrainian professional basketball player for the Sacramento Kings
John Lucas II (b. 1953), former NBA player and coach, tennis player and coach 
Tony Massenburg (b. 1967), former NBA player 
Tom McMillen (b. 1952), U.S. Congressman, former NBA player
 Mike Mentzer (1951–2001), professional bodybuilder and 1979 Mr. Olympia heavyweight champion
Landon Milbourne (b. 1987), basketball player for Hapoel Eilat of the Israeli Basketball Premier League
Terence Morris (b. 1979), former NBA and Israel Basketball Premier League player 
Sean Mosley (b. 1989), basketball player for Hapoel Tel Aviv B.C. of the Israeli Basketball Premier League
Steve Sheppard (b. 1954), former NBA player 
Gene Shue (b. 1931), former NBA player, coach, general manager 
Joe Smith (b. 1975), NBA player, 1995 Naismith College Player of the Year
Diamond Stone (b. 1997), professional basketball player for the TaiwanBeer HeroBears
Rasheed Sulaimon (b. 1994), professional basketball player for JL Bourg of LNB Pro A
Melo Trimble (b. 1995), professional basketball player for Galatasaray Nef
Greivis Vásquez (b. 1987), NBA player, 2010 ACC Player of the Year, Bob Cousy Award winner 
Dez Wells (b. 1992), professional basketball player for Jiangsu Dragons of the Chinese Basketball Association
Chris Wilcox (b. 1982), NBA player 
Buck Williams (b. 1960), former NBA player 
Walt Williams (b. 1970), former NBA player

Coaches
Tom Davis (b. 1938), PhD, head coach at Lafayette, Boston College, Stanford, Iowa, and Drake 
Dave Dickerson (b. 1967), head coach at Tulane 
Chuck Driesell (b. 1962), head coach at The Citadel and Marymount 
Billy Hahn (b. 1953), head coach at La Salle and Ohio Bobcats men's basketball 
Joe Harrington (b. 1945), B.S. 1967, head coach at Colorado, Long Beach State, George Mason, and Hofstra
Billy Jones, head coach at UMBC 
Jim O'Brien (b. 1952), M.B.A. 1981, NBA head coach
Gene Shue (b. 1931), head coach of the Baltimore Bullets, Philadelphia 76ers, and Los Angeles Clippers 
Gary Williams (b. 1945), B.S. 1968, head coach at Maryland, Ohio State, Boston College, and American
Morgan Wootten (1931–2020), B.S. 1956, DeMatha High School basketball coach, Basketball Hall of Fame inductee, winningest basketball coach at any level
Tom Young (b. 1932), 1958, head coach at Old Dominion, Rutgers, and American

Football
Players

Dick Bielski (b. 1932), former NFL back, 1955 NFL Draft first round pick 
Joe Campbell (b. 1955), former NFL defensive end, three-time Pro Bowler 
Dale Castro (b. 1959), tied NCAA record for most field goals in a half, 1979 consensus All-American
Cameron Chism (b. 1990), CFL player
Gary Collins (b. 1940), former NFL wide receiver, 1962 NFL Draft first round pick, NFL 1960s All-Decade Team 
Jon Condo (b. 1981), former NFL long snapper, two-time Pro Bowler
Vernon Davis (b. 1984), former NFL tight end, Super Bowl 50 champion; sixth overall pick in 2006 NFL Draft; tied NFL record for most touchdown receptions by a tight end in a season in 2009
Sean Davis (b. 1993), NFL safety
Stefon Diggs (b. 1993), NFL wide receiver
Michael Dunn (b. 1994), NFL offensive lineman
Trey Edmunds (b. 1994), NFL running back
Boomer Esiason (b. 1961), B.G.S. 1984, former NFL quarterback and current television broadcaster, led the Cincinnati Bengals to Super Bowl XXIII 
Bernie Faloney (1932–1999), former CFL player, 1961 CFL Most Outstanding Player, Canadian Football Hall of Fame inductee 
A. J. Francis (b. 1990), former NFL defensive tackle
Stan Gelbaugh (b. 1962), former NFL quarterback 
Derwin Gray (b. 1995), NFL offensive tackle
E. J. Henderson (b. 1980), former NFL linebacker, 2001 consensus All-American 
Erin Henderson (b. 1986), former NFL linebacker
Darrius Heyward-Bey (b. 1987), first wide receiver selected in the 2009 NFL Draft (seventh overall pick) 
Shaun Hill (b. 1980), former NFL quarterback
D'Qwell Jackson (b. 1983), former NFL linebacker
J. C. Jackson (b. 1995), NFL cornerback, Super Bowl LIII champion
Quinton Jefferson (b. 1993), NFL defensive end
Kris Jenkins (b. 1979), NFL defensive tackle, played in Super Bowl XXXVIII 
Ty Johnson (b. 1997), NFL running back
Stan Jones (1931–2010), former NFL lineman, College and Pro Football Hall of Fame inductee 

LaMont Jordan (b. 1978), former NFL running; 2000 Heisman Trophy candidate
Darius Kilgo (b. 1991), NFL defensive tackle, two-time Super Bowl champion (50 & LI)
Mike Kiselak (b. 1967), former CFL All-Star and NFL player 
Pete Koch (b. 1962), former NFL defensive lineman, 1984 NFL Draft first round pick
Ray Krouse (1927–1966), former NFL defensive tackle, three-time NFL champion 
Jermaine Lewis (b. 1974), former NFL wide receiver, two-time Pro Bowler 
Shawne Merriman (b. 1984), NFL linebacker, 2005 NFL Draft first round pick, 2005 NFL Defensive Rookie of the Year 
Dick Modzelewski (1931–2018), former NFL tackle and head coach, College Football Hall of Fame inductee 
Ed Modzelewski (1929–2015), former NFL back, 1952 NFL Draft first-round pick 
D. J. Moore (b. 1997), NFL wide receiver, first round pick in 2018 NFL Draft (24th overall)
Yannick Ngakoue (b. 1995), NFL defensive end
Nick Novak (b. 1981), former NFL placekicker
Neil O'Donnell (b. 1966), former NFL quarterback, played in Super Bowl XXX 
Bob Pellegrini (1934–2008), former NFL linebacker, College Football Hall of Fame inductee
Adam Podlesh (b. 1983), former NFL punter
Frank Reich (b. 1961), former NFL quarterback, held both the NFL and NCAA records for the largest margin second half comebacks
Darnell Savage (b. 1997), NFL safety, first round pick in the 2019 NFL Draft (21st overall)
Jack Scarbath (1930–2020), B.S. 1954, former NFL quarterback, 1952 Heisman Trophy runner-up, College Football Hall of Fame inductee
Chad Scott (b. 1974), former NFL cornerback, 1997 NFL draft first round pick
Da'Rel Scott (b. 1988), former NFL running back, Super Bowl XLVI champion
Geroy Simon (b. 1975), CFL wide receiver, 2006 CFL Most Outstanding Player
Ron Solt (b. 1962), former NFL guard, 1984 NFL draft first round pick
Steve Suter (b. 1982), set multiple NCAA kick and punt return records 
Torrey Smith (b. 1989), former NFL wide receiver, two-time Super Bowl champion (XLVII & LII)
Mike Tice (b. 1959), former NFL head coach 
Joe Vellano (b. 1988), former NFL defensive tackle, Super Bowl XLIX champion
Al Wallace (b. 1974), NFL defensive end, played in Super Bowl XXXVIII 
Bob Ward (1927–2005), only player ever named an Associated Press first-team All-American at both an offensive and defense position, College Football Hall of Fame inductee
Randy White (b. 1953), former NFL defensive lineman, college and Pro Football Hall of Fame inductee 
LaQuan Williams (b. 1988), former NFL wide receiver, Super Bowl XLVII champion
Frank Wycheck (b. 1971), former NFL tight end, three-time Pro Bowler

Coaches
Dick Bielski (b. 1932), Washington Federals head coach (1984) 
Brooke Brewer (1894–1970), Akron Pros head coach (1922) 
Curley Byrd (1889–1970), Maryland head coach (1911–1934) 
Tom Chisari (1922–1995), Catholic head coach (1948)
Mark Duda (b. 1961), Lackawanna College head coach (1994– )
Bill Elias (1923–1998), George Washington (1960), Virginia (1961–1964), and Navy (1965–1968) head coach
Jack Faber (1903–1994), Maryland head coach (1935, 1940–1941) 
Ralph Friedgen (b. 1947), Maryland head coach (2001–2010) 
Joe Gardi (1939–2010), Philadelphia Bell (1975) and Hofstra (1990–2005) head coach 
Jim LaRue (1925–2015), Arizona head coach (1959–1966)
Dick Modzelewski (1931–2018), Cleveland Browns head coach (1977) 
Tommy Mont (1922–2012), DePauw head coach (1959–1976) 
Joe Moss (b. 1930), Ottawa Rough Riders head coach (1974) 
Frank Navarro (1930–2021), Columbia (1968–1973), Wabash (1974–1978), and Princeton (1978–1984) head coach 
Dick Nolan (1932–2007), San Francisco 49ers (1968–1975) and New Orleans Saints (1978–1980) head coach 
William W. Skinner (1874–1953), Maryland (1892) and Arizona (1900–1901) head coach 
Mike Tice (b. 1959), Minnesota Vikings head coach (2001–2005) 
Ron Waller (1933–2018), San Diego Chargers head coach (1973)

Lacrosse
Jen Adams (b. 1980), B.A. 2001, former women's lacrosse player, Tewaaraton Trophy recipient, head coach of Loyola University Maryland 
Bud Beardmore (1939–2016), 1962, lacrosse player and coach, two national championships, 1973 Coach of the Year, National Lacrosse Hall of Fame inductee
Grant Catalino, 2011, MLL player with Rochester
Jack Faber (1903–1994), B.S. 1926, M.S. 1927, Ph.D. 1937, lacrosse coach, eight national championships, 1959 Coach of the Year, National Lacrosse Hall of Fame inductee
Al Heagy (1906–1990), B.S. 1930, lacrosse player and coach, seven national championships, National Lacrosse Hall of Fame inductee
John Howard (1934–2007), M.A. 1962, Ph.D. 1967, lacrosse coach, 1967 national co-championship, National Lacrosse Hall of Fame inductee
Frank Urso (b. 1954), lacrosse player, National Lacrosse Hall of Fame inductee, one of just four college lacrosse players all-time to earn first-team All-America honors all four seasons

Soccer

Marc Burch (b. 1984), Colorado Rapids
A. J. DeLaGarza (b. 1987), LA Galaxy
Maurice Edu (b. 1986), Major League Soccer (MLS) player, first overall pick of the 2007 MLS SuperDraft 
Omar Gonzalez (b. 1988), Major League Soccer (MLS) player, 2011 MLS Defender of the Year, Two MLS Championships 
Clarence Goodson (b. 1982) San Jose Earthquakes
Jeremy Hall (b. 1988), Toronto F.C.
Taylor Kemp (b. 1990), D.C. United
Zac MacMath (b. 1991), goalkeeper in Major League Soccer, fifth overall pick of the 2011 MLS SuperDraft; Colorado Rapids
Dan Metzger (b. 1993), D.C. United
Patrick Mullins (b. 1992), New York City FC
Chris Odoi-Atsem (b. 1995), D.C. United
Robbie Rogers (b. 1987), LA Galaxy
Jake Rozhansky (b. 1996), American-Israeli midfielder for MLS Next Pro club New England Revolution II
Andrew Samuels (soccer) (b. 1997), Rio Grande Valley
Chris Seitz (b. 1987), MLS player, fourth overall pick of the 2007 MLS SuperDraft 
Alex Shinsky (b. 1993), Chicago Fire
John Stertzer (b. 1990), Real Salt Lake
Schillo Tshuma (b. 1992), Portland Timbers
Taylor Twellman (b. 1980), MLS and United States men's national soccer team player, 2005 MLS MVP
Rodney Wallace (b. 1988), Portland Timbers
Ethan White (b. 1991), Philadelphia Union
London Woodberry (b. 1991), New England Revolution
Graham Zusi (b. 1986), Sporting Kansas City

Track and field
Dominic Berger, track and field athlete
Paula Girven (1958–2020), high jumper
Renaldo Nehemiah (b. 1959), B.A. 1981, track athlete, former holder of the 110m hurdle and current holder of the 55m hurdles world records

Other

Deane Beman (b. 1938), commissioner of the PGA Tour (1974–1994), World Golf Hall of Fame inductee 
Tim Brant (b. 1949), sports television commentator 
Vicky Bullett (b. 1967), women's basketball player, Olympic gold medalist 
Joe Castiglione (b. 1957), athletic director of the University of Oklahoma
Dominique Dawes (b. 1976), Olympic gymnast for the 1992, 1996, 2000 U.S. teams
 Shay Doron (b. 1985), WNBA women's basketball player, basketball guard (New York Liberty)
Dick Dull (c. 1945), athletic director of the University of Maryland (1981–1986) and California State University, Northridge (1999–2005), among others
Geary Eppley (1895–1978), B.S. 1920, M.S. 1926, athletic director of the University of Maryland (1937–1947) 
Fred Funk (b. 1956), professional golfer on the PGA Tour 
Abby Gustaitis (b. 1991), rugby player, US National team
Laura Harper (b. 1986), WNBA women's basketball player, 2006 NCAA women's basketball tournament MOP 
Jim Kehoe (1918–2010), 1940, athletic director of the University of Maryland (1969–1978) 
Ashley Nee (b. 1989), Olympic slalom canoeist
Travis Pastrana (b. 1983), motorsports competitor and stuntman
 Donald Spero (b. 1939), Olympic and world champion rower
Kristi Toliver (b. 1987), WNBA women's basketball player 
Chris Weller (b. 1944), 1966, women's basketball coach of the University of Maryland, Women's Basketball Hall of Fame inductee

Miscellaneous
 Frank Chuman (b. 1917), JD 1945, first Asian American law student at the University of Maryland
 Elaine J. Coates (b. 1937), BA 1959, first African American to graduate from University of Maryland, College Park
 H. David Kotz (b. 1966), attorney
Ronni Karpen Moffitt, political activist murdered along with Orlando Letelier by Chilean agents
Valerie Solanas (1936–1988), B.A. 1957, shot Andy Warhol in 1968; author of the SCUM Manifesto and the unpublished play Up Your Ass
Jean Worthley (1925–2017), naturalist and former host of Hodgepodge Lodge, and co-host of On Nature's Trail
Aryeh Kaplan (1934–1983), (BA 1961) – American Orthodox rabbi, author, and translator known for his knowledge of physics and kabbalah.

Faculty

The following individuals serve or served on the University of Maryland faculty, but are not necessarily alumni.
Lynn Bolles (b. 1949), professor of women's studies
Tim Foecke (b. 1963), Research Professor, Department of Materials Science and Engineering
John D. Gannon (1948–1999), Department Chair and Professor, Computer Science
Patricia Greenspan, professor of philosophy
Juan Ramón Jiménez (1881–1958), professor of Spanish language and literature, 1956 Nobel Prize in Literature 
Barys Kit (1910–2018), professor of mathematics at the European College
Robert P. Kolker, professor emeritus of english, author of books on film/media/cultural studies
Hayim Lapin, professor of Jewish Studies and History and Director of the Joseph and Rebecca Meyerhoff Program and Center for Jewish Studies
Hoda Mahmoudi, research professor and Bahá’í Chair for World Peace
John C. Mather (b. 1946), astrophysicist and adjunct physics professor, 2006 Nobel Prize in Physics 
 Hugh V. Perkins (1918–1988), child development and gerontology educator, author, and former professor of education, Institute for Child Study, Department of Human Development
William Daniel Phillips (b. 1948), adjunct professor of physics, 1997 Nobel Prize in Physics for contributions in laser cooling 
Thomas Schelling (1921–2016), professor emeritus, economics and public policy, 2005 Nobel Memorial Prize in Economic Sciences for game theory analysis
Horace M. Trent (1907–1964), associate professor of physics, best known for finding that a bullwhip's crack is a sonic boom and for being the author of the currently accepted force-current analogy in physics known as the Trent analogy
 David P. Weber, academic director and lecturer, accounting and information assurance, Woodrow Wilson Visiting Fellow
K. J. Ray Liu (b. 1961), professor of A. James Clark School of Engineering. He was elected as 2022 IEEE President and CEO (2021 President-elect; 2023 Past President) in 2020.
Arthur K. Wheelock Jr., professor of art history

Benefactors
This list is intended to capture the notable benefactors and other people connected with the University of Maryland, College Park, but who were not alumni, unless noted with a year of graduation.

Steve Bisciotti (b. 1960), owner of the Baltimore Ravens, benefactor of the athletics program, and personal friend of former men's basketball coach Gary Williams
Michael D. Dingman (1931–2017), (B.A. 1955), international investor
Jack Heise (1924–2009), (B.A. 1947), longtime benefactor of the athletics program
Glenn L. Martin (1886–1955), aircraft pioneer for which the institute of technology is named
Theodore R. McKeldin (1900–1974), Governor of Maryland, 1951–1959
Philip Merrill (1934–2006), media mogul and namesake of the college of journalism
Thomas V. Mike Miller, Jr. (1942–2021), (B.S. 1964), president of the Maryland Senate
Robert Novak (1931–2009), journalist and benefactor the athletics program
Kevin Plank (b. 1972), (B.A. 1996), founder and CEO of Under Armour apparel
Susan Carroll Schwab (b. 1955), former U.S. trade representative and former dean of the School of Public Policy

External links 

 Alumni Association records at the University of Maryland Libraries

References

University of Maryland College Park people